Community Unit School District 300 could refer to:

 Community Unit School District 300 in Kane County and a small part of McHenry County, Illinois — based in Algonquin, Illinois
 Du Quoin Community Unit School District 300 in Perry County, Illinois
 Savanna Community Unit District 300 in Carroll County, Illinois — merged into West Carroll Community Unit District 314
 Rockridge Community Unit School District 300 in Rock Island County, Illinois — based in Taylor Ridge, Illinois
 Sullivan Community Unit School District 300 in Moultrie County, Illinois